Kond Ab (also Romanized as Kond Āb; also known as Gandāb) is a village in Chaharkuh Rural District, in the Central District of Kordkuy County, Golestan Province, Iran. At the 2006 census, its population was 374, in 83 families.

References 

Populated places in Kordkuy County